List of Star Trek: Deep Space Nine novels based on the American science fiction television series of the same name. The book line was published by Simon & Schuster imprints Pocket Books, Pocket Star, Gallery, and Atria.

More recent Deep Space Nine novels link directly with other Star Trek book lines and series, such as: Destiny (2008), Typhon Pact (2010–2012), The Fall (2013–14), and the relaunch of the Section 31 series.

Episode novelizations 
Based on select episodes from the television series. Call to Arms (1998) and Sacrifice of Angels (1998) are based on a seven episode arc from Deep Space Nine fifth and sixth seasons.

Numbered novels 
Numbered paperback releases:

Young adult novels 
Star Trek: Deep Space Nine young adult series follows the adventures of Jake Sisko and Nog while living aboard Deep Space Nine.

Original novels 
Includes hardcover and paperback releases:

Omnibus editions 
Collections of novels from the Deep Space Nine book line.

Miniseries

Rebels (1999) 

Millennium (2000) 
The series was partially adapted as The Fallen (2000), a third-person shooter video game developed by The Collective. An omnibus edition was published in 2002.

Mission Gamma (2002) 

Star Trek: Deep Space NineMission Gamma relaunch miniseries follows the crew of the  under the command of Elias Vaughn. These Haunted Seas (2008) omnibus collects Twilight (2002) and This Gray Spirit (2002). The cover art by Cliff Nielsen forms a polyptych. Original Sin (2017) has a similar premise.

Worlds of Deep Space Nine (2004–05) 
Worlds of Star Trek: Deep Space Nine relaunch miniseries explores the various home worlds of the crew and residents of Deep Space Nine. The series was created and edited by Marco Palmieri.

Terok Nor (2008) 
Star Trek: Terok Nor relaunch miniseries explores the history of the Deep Space Nine station during the Bajoran Occupation when it was known by its Cardassian name: Terok Nor. The series is linked to the Lost Era (2003–2014). The cover art by John Picacio forms a triptych. The Deep Space Nine subtitle was omitted.

Gamma (2017) 
Star Trek: Deep Space NineGamma relaunch miniseries follows the crew of  under the command of Benjamin Sisko. Only one novel has been published. Mission Gamma (2002) has a similar premise.

Short story collections 
Collections featuring characters and settings from Deep Space Nine.

Relaunch novels 
Interlinked novels set after the episode "What You Leave Behind". The Lives of Dax (2001), a short story collection edited by Marco Palmieri, and A Stitch in Time (2000), by Andrew J. Robinson, are linked to the relaunch.

See also 
 List of Star Trek novels

Notes

References

External links 
 
 

Book series introduced in 1993
 
 
 
 
Lists of novels based on works